Berkhamsted railway station is in the town of Berkhamsted, Hertfordshire, England. It is located just beside Berkhamsted Castle, overlooking the Grand Junction Canal. London Northwestern Railway operates services to London, Northampton and many other destinations.

There are 4 platforms of 12-car length on both the fast and slow lines. The platforms are arranged around a central island and two side platforms. The station is relatively unusual on the route in that most of the original buildings have been retained.

History

The present Berkhamsted station dates from 1875, and is located on the Lower King's road on the junction with Brownlow Road. It was designed in an Elizabethan style of architecture with a brick gabled booking hall. The building was replaced by a new station with additional sidings in 1875 when the railway was widened, the sidings replacing an earlier goods yard near Gravel Path.

During the building of the London and Birmingham Railway (the L&BR, today's West Coast Main Line) in the 1830s, Berkhamsted was for a few years a centre of railway construction. The armies of navvies, bricklayers and miners brought in from the English Midlands, Ireland, London and the North of England led to overcrowding in Berkhamsted and the rowdy behaviour of the labourers was said to have offended the genteel townsfolk. Seven young men aged 18–26 were killed while working on the Berkhamsted section of the railway.

Before construction work on the Berkhamsted section of the L&BR began, the project was subject to public protest. Many landowners and turnpike trustees in Hertfordshire were opposed to the new railway line, and protest meetings were held at the King's Arms Hotel in Berkhamsted. Although local opposition to the iron horse was led by noblemen such as the Earls of Essex, Clarendon and Brownlow, the railway line received Royal Assent in 1833.

Led by chief engineer Robert Stephenson, works commenced in 1834 to build a high railway embankment on top of the ruined barbican and moat of Berkhamsted Castle. The brick embankment was built on deep foundations using earth taken from the Sunnyside cutting a mile further south. Once railway tracks were laid, it was possible to use a steam locomotive to move earth and bricks: the Harvey Coombe (or Harvey Combe) was brought up from London by barge on the Grand Junction Canal to assist construction work, and was assembled at Pix Farm in Bourne End. When this locomotive began running on the line works, it was the first time any local people had seen a railway engine.

The L&BR line opened in 1837, with trains running between London and Boxmoor in July, with service extended to Tring in October of that year. The first passenger train passed through Berkhamsted on 16 October 1837, 59 minutes after leaving London.

Extension plans
The Great Central Railway also considered a proposal to extend the branch from Chalfont Road to Chesham further north to Berkhamsted and Tring. This proposal was abandoned.

In 1887 there was a proposal to build a narrow-gauge steam tramway along the main road from Hemel Hempstead to Bourne End, and then along the Bourne Gutter Valley to Chesham. Campaigners sought to extend this route via Berkhamsted, but the project also came to nothing.

Development
In 2013, as part of its "Access for All" programme, Network Rail and London Midland  began construction work to install lifts to provide access for disabled passengers to platforms, as required by the Disability Discrimination Act 1995. Three lifts were completed and eventually opened for public use on Friday 13 March 2015, serving platforms 1, 2/3 and 4.

An electrical substation was installed outside the front of the station in April 2014 to improve the electricity supply to overhead wires on the West Coast Main Line. The installation, which is enclosed by metal railings, was criticised for its appearance and prominent position in front of a Victorian railway station and in close proximity to the 11th-century Berkhamsted Castle.

Services

Current Services
All services at Berkhamsted are operated by London Northwestern Railway.

The typical off-peak service in trains per hour is:
The typical off-peak service in trains per hour is:
 4 tph to London Euston
 2 tph to 
 2 tph to 

During the peak hours, a number of additional services between London Euston, Tring and  call at the station.

On Sundays, the station is served  by a half-hourly service between London Euston and Milton Keynes Central.

Former Services

Connex South Central
In June 1997, Connex South Central began operating services between Gatwick Airport and Rugby via the Brighton and West London Lines that called at Berkhamsted with Class 319s. It was cut back to terminate at Milton Keynes in December 2000 before being withdrawn in May 2002 due to capacity constraints on the West Coast Main Line while it was upgraded.

Southern
Southern reintroduced the service in February 2009 with Class 377s operating initially operating from Brighton to Milton Keynes before being curtailed at its southern end at South Croydon and later Clapham Junction. In May 2022, Southern cut the service back to terminate at Watford Junction, thus ceasing to serve Berkhamsted.

Future development

An announcement made in August 2014 by the then transport secretary Patrick McLoughlin indicated that the government was actively evaluating the possibility of extending Crossrail as far as Tring, however in August 2016, the Department for Transport confirmed that the scheme had been cancelled due to "poor overall value for money to the taxpayer".

References

External links 

Railway stations in Hertfordshire
DfT Category C2 stations
Former London and Birmingham Railway stations
Railway stations in Great Britain opened in 1838
Railway stations in Great Britain closed in 1875
Railway stations in Great Britain opened in 1875
Railway stations served by West Midlands Trains
Stations on the West Coast Main Line
Berkhamsted